The Mid North Coast Correctional Centre, an Australian minimum to maximum security prison for males and females, is located in Aldavilla, West Kempsey, New South Wales, Australia,  north of Sydney. The facility is operated by Corrective Services NSW, an agency of the Department of Attorney General and Justice, of the Government of New South Wales. The Centre accepts sentenced and unsentenced felons under New South Wales and/or Commonwealth legislation.

History
Built on an old Aboriginal site that was a sacred area to the Dunghutti nation, the centre was opened by the Premier, Bob Carr, in July 2004.

Notable inmates
Rodney Adlerdisgraced businessman.
Austin Allan Hughesco–convicted for the 1994 murder of John Ashfield, aged six years.
Bronson Blessington - At the age of just 14 was sentenced to life imprisonment for his role in the 1988 murder of Janine Balding

See also

Punishment in Australia

References

External links
Mid North Coast Correctional Centre website

Prisons in New South Wales
Maximum security prisons in Australia
Mid North Coast
2004 establishments in Australia
Buildings and structures completed in 2004
Kempsey Shire